Jujubinus karpathoensis is a species of sea snail, a marine gastropod mollusk in the family Trochidae, the top snails. Like all other trochids, these snails have coiled shells in the adult stage.

Description
The height of the shell attains 6 mm.

Distribution
This species occurs in the Eastern Mediterranean Sea.

References

 Nordsieck F. (1973). Il genere Jujubinus Monterosato, 1884 in Europa. La Conchiglia 50: 6–7, 11–12

External links
 

karpathoensis
Gastropods described in 1973
Molluscs of Europe